The 2021–22 EHF Champions League was the 62nd edition of Europe's premier club handball tournament and the 29th edition under the current EHF Champions League format, running from 15 September 2021 to 19 June 2022. Barça won the competition, defeating Łomza Vive Kielce on penalties in the final.

Because of the COVID-19 pandemic, each local health department allowed a different number of spectators.

Format
The competition began with a group stage featuring 16 teams divided in two groups. Matches were played in a double round-robin system with home-and-away fixtures. In Groups A and B, the top two teams qualified for the quarterfinals, with teams ranked third to sixth entering the playoffs.

The knockout stage included four rounds: the playoffs, quarterfinals, and a final-four tournament comprising two semifinals and the final. In the playoffs, eight teams were paired against each other in two-legged home-and-away matches. The four aggregate winners of the playoffs advanced to the quarterfinals, joining the top-two teams of Groups A and B. The eight quarterfinalist teams were paired against each other in two-legged home-and-away matches, with the four aggregate winners qualifying to the final-four tournament. 

In the final four tournament, the semifinals and the final were played as single matches at a pre-selected host venue.

Teams
The final list of 16 participants was revealed by the EHF Executive Committee in June 2021. Ten teams were registered according to fixed places, while six were granted wild cards. On 29 June, the final list was revealed.

Group stage

The draw took place on 2 July 2021.

Group A

Group B

Knockout stage

Playoffs

Quarterfinals

Final four
The final four was held at the Lanxess Arena in Cologne, Germany on 18 and 19 June 2022.

Bracket

Final

Top goalscorers

Awards

The all-star team was announced on 17 June 2022.

References

External links
Official website

 
2021
EHF Champions League
EHF Champions League
EHF Champions League